Tahltan is the name of a Northern Athabaskan people in northwestern British Columbia, and also the name of their language.  It may also refer to:

the Tahltan Nation, a tribal council
the Tahltan First Nation, one of the two member band governments of that tribal council
the Tahltan River
the Upper Tahltan River
Tahltan, British Columbia, at the confluence of the Stikine and Tahltan Rivers.
Tahltan Indian Reserve No. 1, at Tahltan, BC
Tahltan Forks Indian Reserve No. 5, at Tahltan, BC
Upper Tahltan Indian Reserve No. 4, near Tahltan, BC
Tahltan Indian Reserve No. 10, NE of Tahltan BC at the confluence of the Stikine and Klastline Rivers.
the Tahltan Highland, a landform in the region